Claudio Pérez (born 1 March 1957) is a Venezuelan former cyclist. He competed in the team time trial event at the 1980 Summer Olympics.

References

External links
 

1957 births
Living people
Venezuelan male cyclists
Olympic cyclists of Venezuela
Cyclists at the 1980 Summer Olympics
Place of birth missing (living people)
20th-century Venezuelan people